William Dickson Smith (2 February 1918 – 25 January 2002) was a Scottish amateur golfer. He was known as Dick or Dickson. He tied for 5th place in the 1957 Open Championship and played in the 1959 Walker Cup.

Amateur wins
1958 Scottish Amateur

Results in major championships

Note: Smith only played in The Open Championship.

CUT = missed the half-way cut
"T" indicates a tie for a place

Team appearances
Walker Cup (representing Great Britain & Ireland): 1959
St Andrews Trophy (representing Great Britain & Ireland): 1958 (winners)

References

Scottish male golfers
Amateur golfers
Golfers from Glasgow
1918 births
2002 deaths